Jeff A. McMahan, CFE, is an American politician from the U.S. state of Oklahoma. A Democrat, he served as Oklahoma State Auditor and Inspector from 2003 until his resignation in June 2008.

Conviction and resignation
In 2008, McMahan and his wife, Lori McMahan, were indicted by a federal grand jury on charges of accepting improper cash and gifts from an Oklahoma businessman. In June 2008 a federal jury convicted McMahan and his wife on one count of conspiracy and two counts in violation of the Travel Act, prohibiting interstate travel in support of racketeering. Two days following his conviction, he resigned as State Auditor and Inspector.

Jeff McMahan was sentenced to eight years and a month in federal prison, while Lori McMahan was sentenced to six years and six months. They entered prison in March 2009. Lori McMahan was released in 2014 and Jeff McMahan was released in 2016.

2006 election results

The election results are as follows:

References

Living people
Year of birth missing (living people)
State Auditors of Oklahoma
Oklahoma Democrats
Oklahoma politicians convicted of crimes
Politicians convicted under the Travel Act